Clifford Singer is an American distinguished professor, researcher, and contemporary artist.

Biography
Singer is the Emeritus professor of nuclear, plasma, radiological engineering, and political science at University of Illinois Urbana-Champaign. He was a National Science Foundation Postdoctoral Fellow at MIT. He also served as an Alexander von Humboldt Fellow at Max Planck Institutes in Germany for Strömungsforschung and Plasmaphysik in Göttingen and Garching. Singer has researched significantly on issues related to the cessation of production of nuclear materials for nuclear explosives programs, including related matters dealing with outer space and the future of nuclear explosives stockpiles.

Career
Singer's  work revolves around the theme of "Geometrical Clouds," with the earliest pieces bearing that name appearing in the 1970s. Singer also worked as an art Curator and has curated exhibitions from the O.I.A, Geometric Abstraction in 1980, Brooklyn Law School; Art & Mathematics 2000, The Cooper Union; and Printed Editions, Art  & Mathematics 2022 (virtual exhibition) 
In 1981, Singer exhibited his art Black Line on Yellow at The Aldrich Contemporary Art Museum, his style was compared to Al Held
He uses color fields, lines that are converging, diverging, parallel, or approaching asymptotically, circles, ellipses, hyperbolas, and other classical curves from both ancient and modern mathematics in his works.

Selected publications

References

1955 births
Living people
University of Illinois Urbana-Champaign alumni
University of California, Berkeley alumni
University of Illinois Urbana-Champaign faculty
Nuclear physicists